Gordana Matković (born 15 March 1960) is a Serbian politician. She served as General Adviser of the former President of Serbia Boris Tadić from 2004 to 2012. Previously, she served as the Minister of Social Affairs in the Government of Serbia from 2000 to 2004.

Career
She is the Director of the Social Policy Studies Department in Center for Liberal-democratic studies and her professional interest covers different fields such as social insurance and social policy, demography, labor economics and human development. She works as a consultant for the World Bank, UNDP and UNICEF. She is a Visiting professor at the University of Belgrade Faculty of Economics.

From 2000 to 2004, she was the Minister of Social Affairs in the Government of Serbia under Zoran Đinđić. From 2004 to 2012, she was the General Adviser of the President of Serbia Boris Tadić.

In 2004, Matković received the "Konstantnin Obradović" award in the area of human rights promotion and in 2005 she won the annual Women in Business and Government award given by the Erste Bank and the European Bank for Reconstruction and Development.

References
 Biography of Gordana Matković General Secretariat of the President of the Republic

External links

1960 births
Living people
Politicians from Belgrade
Government ministers of Serbia
Democratic Party (Serbia) politicians
University of Belgrade Faculty of Economics alumni
Women government ministers of Serbia